"Baelor" is the ninth and penultimate episode of the first season of the HBO medieval fantasy television series Game of Thrones. First aired on June 12, 2011, it was written by series creators and executive producers David Benioff and D. B. Weiss, and directed by Alan Taylor, his directorial debut for the series.

The plot depicts Eddard Stark (Sean Bean), imprisoned and accused of high treason, struggling with the decision whether to falsely confess to save his daughters, and he is ultimately beheaded by King Joffrey Baratheon (Jack Gleeson). Stark's wife Catelyn (Michelle Fairley) negotiates with Lord Walder Frey (David Bradley) for the use of a strategic river crossing as their son Robb (Richard Madden) fights his first battle in the war against the Lannisters. Meanwhile, Jon Snow (Kit Harington) discovers a secret about Maester Aemon (Peter Vaughan), and Daenerys Targaryen (Emilia Clarke) stands up to Dothraki soldier Qotho (Dar Salim) and challenges Dothraki traditions to care for Khal Drogo (Jason Momoa). The title refers to the Great Sept (house of worship) in King's Landing where Ned meets his fate.

The episode received great acclaim among critics, who cited the final scene with Eddard Stark's beheading as a highlight for the series, calling it a "daring, tragic finish." In the United States, the episode achieved a viewership of 2.66 million in its initial broadcast. The episode was nominated for an Emmy Award for Outstanding Writing for a Drama Series and Peter Dinklage won the award for Outstanding Supporting Actor in a Drama Series for his performance.

Plot

In Lhazar
Khal Drogo is weakened by his infected wound, and Jorah warns that if Drogo dies, his bloodriders will fight to be his successor and kill Daenerys and her unborn child. Daenerys refuses to abandon her husband, and encourages Mirri Maz Duur to use blood magic. She prepares a spell, warning that no one may enter the tent, and Jorah kills Qotho when he tries to intervene. Daenerys goes into premature labor, but the Dothraki midwives refuse to help. Desperate, Jorah carries Daenerys into Drogo's tent to seek Mirri's help.

At the Wall
Jeor Mormont gives Jon Snow his ancestral Valyrian steel sword Longclaw. Jon is upset he cannot join Robb against the Lannisters.

Maester Aemon reveals to Jon that he is Aemon Targaryen, the Mad King Aerys's uncle and Daenerys Targaryen's great-uncle, and advises Jon that the choice he must make between the Night's Watch and his family will haunt him the rest of his life.

In the Riverlands
The Stark army reaches the Twins, a bridge stronghold controlled by Walder Frey, who agrees to allow the army to cross the river and to commit his troops in return for Robb and Arya Stark marrying two of his children.

Tyrion Lannister suspects his father Tywin, who decides Tyrion and his barbarians will fight in the vanguard, wants him killed. As Tyrion, Bronn, and the prostitute Shae swap stories, Tyrion reveals he was married to a woman his father revealed was a prostitute, and made Tyrion watch as his guardsmen raped her.

As a Stark force approaches, Tyrion is trampled in the rush and regains consciousness to find the battle over. Tywin discovers the Stark host was only 2,000 men, not the 20,000 he was led to expect.

Robb, having divided his forces, defeats Jaime Lannister's army with his remaining 18,000 men and captures Jaime.

In King's Landing
After Varys tells him that Sansa Stark's life is also at stake, Eddard "Ned" Stark agrees to make a false confession and swear loyalty to King Joffrey Baratheon.

Arya Stark finds a crowd gathering to watch her father be judged, and climbs onto the statue of Baelor the Blessed. Ned notices Arya and alerts Night's Watch recruiter Yoren. Before Sansa, Cersei Lannister, Joffrey and the Small Council, Ned confesses to treason and swears fealty to Joffrey. Instead of sparing Ned as promised, Joffrey orders him to be executed, much to everyone's, and especially Sansa's, horror. Seeing that Arya has been rescued by Yoren, Ned accepts his fate and is beheaded with his own sword, as a powerless Arya is taken to safety by Yoren.

Production

Writing
The episode was written by the showrunners David Benioff and D. B. Weiss, based on the original book by George R. R. Martin.

The title of the episode refers to the Great Sept of Baelor, the main religious building in King's Landing, where the episode's pivotal scene takes place. In the world created by George R. R. Martin, Baelor I Targaryen was a king during a previous century, revered as a patron and supporter of the Faith of the Seven. "Baelor" includes the content of the book's chapters Eddard XV, Catelyn IX, Jon VIII, Tyrion VIII, Catelyn X, Daenerys VIII and Arya V (59–61 and 63–66).

The scene with the drinking game between Tyrion, Bronn and Shae was written specifically for the episode, but the story of Tyrion's ill-fated marriage to Tysha was taken from a previous chapter of the books. Shae's background was changed from Westerosi to foreign to accommodate Kekilli's accent. Other notable divergence from the books include the modification of the whole strategy of Robb Stark when dividing his forces, and a change to the Targaryen genealogy as explained by Maester Aemon: in the TV adaptation the Mad King is described as the son, rather than the grandson, of Aegon V (thus eliminating Jaehaerys II from the succession of kings).

Casting

"Baelor" marks the first appearance of the German actress Sibel Kekilli, in the role of the prostitute Shae. Executive producer George R. R. Martin commented that she was extraordinary in her audition, in which she read the scene where Shae meets Tyrion in a tent the night before the battle of the Green Fork. According to Martin, "a lot of beautiful young women read for Shae. [...] But there's another dimension to Shae as well. She's not as practiced and hardened at this as a more seasoned pro. There's still a girl next door quality to her, a sense of vulnerability, playfulness, and, yes, innocence. [...] All of our Shaes were hot as hell. But only a handful of them captured that other quality, maybe three out of twenty, and Sibel was the standout. [...] Watching those auditions, any red-blooded male would want to take every one of our Shae candidates to bed. But Sibel made you fall in love with her as well."

Also introduced in this episode was the English actor David Bradley, playing the role of Walder Frey.

Filming locations
Benioff and Weiss hired Alan Taylor to direct this episode because of his work in their favorite episodes from some great television shows, noting that Taylor was known for directing television episodes depicting the deaths of main characters like Julius Caesar in Rome, Wild Bill Hickok in Deadwood and Christopher Moltisanti in The Sopranos. They also admired Taylor's directing style, describing his shots as "cinematic and precise".

The interiors of the episode were filmed at the Paint Hall studios, close to Belfast. The area of the Castle Ward estate, also in Northern Ireland, was used to film on location the Stark and Lannister camps, the Crossing, and the battlefields of the Green Fork and the Whispering Woods.

The climactic scene before the Great Sept of Baelor was shot at Fort Manoel, in the Maltese town of Gżira. The filming took place in the last week of October 2010.

Execution
Years later, showrunner D. B. Weiss commented that the explicit style of the execution scene was selected in part to make it clear to the viewers that Eddard Stark, despite being the arguable protagonist of season one, actually was dead: "It’s that rule: 'If you don't see the body then they’re not really dead.' Like when we cut Ned’s head off, we didn’t want a gory Monty Python geyser of blood, but we needed to see the blade enter his neck and cut out on the frame where the blade was mid-neck. [...] we needed Ned's death to be totally unambiguous". Martin was satisfied with how Taylor pulled off Stark's execution, feeling that "the death of Ned Stark could not have been done better".

Reception

Ratings
"Baelor" gathered 2.7 million viewers in its premiere telecast in the United States, equaling the season high reached with the previous week's episode. The total for the night, including the repeat, was slightly lower, with 3.4 million viewers. In the United Kingdom, the episode was viewed by 1.043 million viewers, making it the highest-rated broadcast that week.

Critical response
The episode received great acclaim among the critics. Review aggregator Rotten Tomatoes surveyed 19 reviews of the episode and judged 100% of them to be positive with an average score of 9.52 out of 10. The website's critical consensus reads, "Veering slightly from the source material, "Baelor" sports excellent performances and a bold, unprecedented climax." From the reviewers of The A.V. Club, where it was rated  with an A, Emily VanDerWerff called it "unquestionably the finest episode of Game of Thrones yet," and David Sims found it "terrific" and with a conclusion that would be "sure to blow the minds (and break the hearts)" of the watchers. Matt Fowler of IGN gave the episode a perfect "10" saying that it was a "clean and epic entry with a daring, tragic finish" that had "an admirable undercurrent of audience contempt."

The focus of most reviews was in the climactic final scene, whose directing and acting is universally acclaimed by critics. Writing for Cultural Learnings, Myles McNutt stated: "the final shot, with Arya looking to the sky as everything goes to silence and all she sees is the birds flying was just wonderfully haunting. Alan Taylor's direction sold both the chaos and the resignation of that moment." HitFix's Alan Sepinwall felt that "that final scene was so gorgeously shot, and the weariness of Bean's performance and the horror of Maisie Williams' so perfectly conveyed the emotions of it, even as things seemed so chaotic."

The emotional charge of the scene hit home for many reviewers: Scott Meslow of The Atlantic called it "an absolutely nightmarish scene" and labelled Eddard's death "horrific in its indignity." Jace Lacob from Televisionary and Maureen Ryan from AOL TV admitted having shed tears at the episode's dramatic conclusion. The latter found the scene "masterful" and felt that the visual medium and Alan Taylor's excellent work had made it more powerful than the book's original version.

Besides the final scene, other aspects were discussed: Garcia noted the acting of Richard Madden and how the Freys had been introduced. Ryan praised the wide range of emotions used by Emilia Clarke while playing Daenerys, and how Peter Dinklage played Tyrion's frustration and confusion during the episode. Both she and McNutt were glad that Tyrion's exposition scene in the tent with Bronn and Shae did not use sex to keep viewers, as was done in past episodes.

There was debate about the merits of the producer's decision to avoid depicting the two battles between the Starks and Lannisters. Ryan criticized it and confessed being "a little disappointed that many of the major characters are caught up in a war and we're not seeing it." Sims regretted not seeing the fight, and although he said he understood the budget constrictions, he felt that "all this off-screen fighting is just getting my blood rushing for some on-screen fighting." Sepinwall concludes: "Ideally, we'd get a few epic, Braveheart-level battle scenes at some point, but I also respect the demands of time and budget here. Those kinds of sequences cost a fortune, and they eat up a lot of screen time, and I think ultimately I'd have rather had the time, say, that we spent in Tyrion's tent the night before the battle, with the mortifying story of his ex-wife, and then whatever it cost to make the execution sequence look as good as it did, than for the episode to have given us one or two long fight scenes."

In 2013, TV Guide ranked the final scene as the second greatest twist of all time.

Awards and nominations

References

External links

 "Baelor" at HBO
 

2011 American television episodes
Game of Thrones (season 1) episodes
Television episodes written by David Benioff and D. B. Weiss